Bachchan is a 2013 Indian Kannada-language psychological action film  directed by Shashank and starring Sudeepa, Jagapathi Babu, Bhavana, Parul Yadav, and Tulip Joshi in the lead roles The musical score and soundtrack were composed by V. Harikrishna and cinematography was handled by Shekar Chandru.

Bachchan was released on 11 April 2013 in India and was also released in Dubai and other countries like Germany, Perth, Melbourne and Adelaide. The film was dubbed into Telugu and Hindi with the same name and in Tamil as Murattu Kaidhi in 2015.
The core plot of the movie was used in the 2016 Bangladeshi film Mental.

Plot
A anonymous person murders SI Mahesh Deshpande and Dr. Srinivas Iyengar, who runs a nursery home. After an intense cat-and-mouse chase from the police. The person gets caught in the truck accident and is taken into custody. The CBI appoints Vijaykumar to investigate, who later interrogates the suspect. 

In the interrogation room. The person reveals himself as Bharath, who is a real estate dealer where he narrates about 3 suspects: Jayaraj (a real estate Kingpin), Dr.Srinivas Iyengar and SI Mahesh Deshpande. The trio had tortured Bharath for many days and had brainwashed Anjali to commit suicide during their wedding anniversary. Vijaykumar investigates the incidents, only to learn from Anjali (who is alive) and a psychiatrist that Bharath has schizophrenia, which resulted in him thinking that Anjali was killed by them. Bharath is admitted to NIMHANS where he undergoes treatment but escapes from the asylum where he tracks Jayaraj at his nightclub and whisks him away in a sheep truck. 

After a complaint from a lawyer due to a minor accident. Vijay Kumar deduces that Bharath is pretending to be ill and the murders were planned by him, his, and Anjali's family. Vijay Kumar brings Bharath and Anjali's family where they divulge the truth behind these murders. Bharath was in love with Anjali's sister Ashwini, who is completing her MS in Bellary. Ashwini learnt from Sanyappa and his wife Lakshmavva about the illegal mining activities resulting in water being contaminated and leading to diseases which destroyed their village inhabitants and also their infant child. Ashwini encouraged the villagers to protest against the factory by complaining to the DC. 

However, the next morning, Ashwini found the village destroyed and reported to SI Deshpande where she is taken to Madhusudhan, who is a cabinet minister along with his partner Jayaraj. It is revealed that Deshpande and Dr. Iyengar were in cahoots with them and also revealed that they orchestrated the massacre when the villagers were ready to complain against them. They brutally killed Ashwini and buried her. Sanyappa, who escaped from the massacre learnt about Bharath and revealed Ashwini's death. Devastated, Bharath and the family planned together to avenge Ashwini's death and distract the cops. After revealing the truth, Anjali tells that Bharath has brought Jayaraj and Madhusudhan at the latter's mining den where Vijay Kumar heads towards the mines. 

At the mines, Bharath kills Madhusudhan and Jayaraj by using the Haul truck, thereby avenging Ashwini's death. Sanyappa commits suicide by burning the truck. Bharath surrenders to the police and the news coverage reports about Jayaraj and Madhusudhan's death in the accident at their mining. The mining is seised and strict actions will be taken against the miners for any harmful activities. Three months later, Vijay Kumar gives a false testimation and saves Bharath from jail term, believing that he did the right thing in killing the anti-social elements. Bharath is released from custody and reunited with his family.

Cast

 Sudeepa as Bharath aka Bachchan
 Jagapathi Babu as Vijay Kumar
 Bhavana as Ashwini 
 Parul Yadav as Anjali 
 Tulip Joshi as Monica
 Jai Jagadish as Bharath's father
 Sudha Belawadi as Bharath's mother
 Nassar as Dr. Srinivasa Iyengar
 Pradeep Rawat as Minister Madhusudhan
 Ashish Vidyarthi as Mahesh Deshpande
 P. Ravi Shankar as Jayaraj
 Ramakrishna as Ramnath (Anjali's father)
 Shruthi as Lakshmavva aka Lakshmi
 Achyuth Kumar as Sanyappa Gadigi (Lakshmi's husband)
 Sadhu Kokila as Jewellery Store Staff
 Bullet Prakash as Broker Puttaswamy
 Arun Sagar as Assistant CCB Officer
 Daisy Shah as a bar dancer (cameo appearance in the item song "Mysore Pakkalli")

Production
Initially, Aindrita Ray was approached for the lead female role. Later Bhavana was finalized as the leading lady. Jagapati Babu has been signed up to do a special appearance in film. P. Ravi Shankar, Ashish Vidyarthi, and Pradeep Rawat were roped in to play the roles of the villains. For the second lead actress role, an upcoming successful actress, Deepa Sannidhi, had been signed on first. However, on 19 June, reports came out that the actress had been ousted following a change in the script and instead, Pranitha Subhash had been reportedly roped in The makers had been on the lookout for a suitable replacement, which they found in Hindi film actor Tulip Joshi.

Music

Release

Theatrical 
The film made its theatrical release on 11 April 2013 on over 190 theatres in India. The film released in Dubai and other middle eastern countries on 18 April 2013. and also released in Germany and Australia.
The Telugu dubbed version was released on 17 May 2014 in over 300 theatres.

Marketing 
Actor V. Ravichandran released the teaser trailer on 31 May 2012 at Gold Finch Hotel.

Home media 

Reception

Critical response 
Bachchan was appreciated for its the technical aspects, cast performances, action sequences, visual style and writing.

A critic from Sify rated the movie a 4/5 and concluded "Sudeep comes out on the top with his brilliant performance, both in acting and in action sequences. When it comes to action movies, it could be one of Sudeep's best". A critic from Bangalore Mirror scored the film at 4 out of 5 stars and says "Shashank has shown conviction in the screenplay he created. He manages to tell a story without action being too overpowering. If you enjoy action and surprises, look no further than Bachchan. Make sure the AC is working in the theatre though". A critic from The Times of India scored the film at 4 out of 5 stars and says "Sudeep has done a commendable job as Bharath. Parul impresses you with her excellent dialogue delivery and expression. Ravishankar is amazing as a villain. Music by V Harikrishna has some catchy tunes. Cinematography by Shekhar Chandra is impressive. All credit to Imran".

Accolades

References

External links 
 
 
 

2013 films
Films directed by Shashank
Indian action thriller films
2013 action thriller films
Indian films about revenge
Films scored by V. Harikrishna
2010s Kannada-language films
Indian courtroom films
Kannada films remade in other languages